"World So Cold" is the final single from group Mudvayne's second record The End of All Things to Come. The song is very different from the rest of the band's work, being much more mellow while building intensity during the song's bridge and ending. Its lyrics take on a saddened and deeply personal tone in their sense of resentment toward society.

Music video
A music video was produced for the single. It features the band performing in a room filled with what appears to be cardboard cut-outs of people. The video was shot in Toronto, Canada. It was directed by Christopher Mills of Toronto-based Revolver Films, who had previously directed the video for PDA by indie rock band Interpol.

Track listing

Charts

References

External links
 

2002 songs
2003 singles
Mudvayne songs
Heavy metal ballads
2000s ballads
Songs written by Chad Gray
Songs written by Ryan Martinie
Songs written by Matthew McDonough
Songs written by Greg Tribbett
Song recordings produced by David Bottrill
Epic Records singles